Raymond Roger Trencavel (also Raimond, ; 1185 – 10 November 1209) was a member of the noble Trencavel family. He was viscount of Béziers and Albi (and thus a vassal of the count of Toulouse), and viscount of Carcassonne and the Razès (and thus a vassal of the count of Barcelona, which was also ruling Aragon at this time). 

Raymond-Roger was the son of Roger II Trencavel (d. 1194), and of Azalais of Toulouse (also known as the "Countess of Burlats"), daughter of Raymond V of Toulouse and sister of Raymond VI. Raymond-Roger was married to Agnes of Montpellier. His aunt, Beatrice of Béziers, was the second wife of Raymond VI of Toulouse.

Raymond-Roger lived in the Château Comtal in the fortified hill town of Carcassonne. The château was built by his ancestors in the 11th century. Raymond-Roger was not a Cathar, although many of his subjects were. He adopted a laissez-faire attitude to Catharism – and to other cultures and religions. He relied strongly on Jews to run Béziers, his second seat of power.

By mid-1209, at the beginning of the Albigensian Crusade, around 10,000 crusaders had gathered in Lyon and began to march south. In June, Raymond of Toulouse, recognizing the potential disaster at hand, promised to act against the Cathars, and his excommunication was lifted. The crusaders headed towards Montpellier and the lands of Raymond-Roger de Trencavel, aiming for the Cathar communities around Albi and Carcassonne. Like Raymond VI of Toulouse, Raymond-Roger de Trencavel sought an accommodation with the crusaders, but Raymond-Roger was refused a meeting and raced back to Carcassonne to prepare his defences. The city of Béziers was sacked in July and its population massacred. 

The town of Carcassonne was well fortified, but vulnerable and over-populated with refugees. The crusaders, led by a papal legate, Arnaud Amaury, Abbot of Cîteaux, arrived outside the town on 1 August 1209. As vassal of King Peter II of Aragon, Raymond-Roger had hoped for protection, but Peter was powerless to oppose Pope Innocent III's army and could act only as a mediator.

The siege did not last long. By 7 August the crusaders had cut the town's access to water. Raymond-Roger accepted a safe-conduct to negotiate terms of surrender in the Crusader camp. At the conclusion of these negotiations he was taken prisoner while still under safe conduct, and imprisoned in his own dungeon, where he died, possibly of dysentery, though there were suspicions of poisoning.

The town of Carcassonne had surrendered on 15 August. The inhabitants were not massacred but were forced to leave the town. Simon de Montfort was granted control of the area encompassing Carcassonne, Albi, and Béziers. Raymond-Roger's dispossessed son, Raymond II (1204-1263), formally ceded his rights to Louis IX of France in 1247, after several failed attempts to recover his patrimony.

Sources
Graham-Leigh, Elaine. The Southern French Nobility and the Albigensian Crusade. Woodbridge: The Boydell Press, 2005. .

1185 births
1209 deaths
Occitan nobility
People of the Albigensian Crusade
Trencavel